is a Japanese gag manga series written and illustrated by Kyosuke Usuta. The story is about Kiyohiko "Piyohiko" Saketome, an aspiring musician whose daily life takes a bizarre turn when he meets Jaguar, an eccentric man obsessed with recorders. It was serialized in Shueisha's Weekly Shōnen Jump from September 2000 to August 2010, with its chapters collected in 20 tankōbon volumes. It was adapted into a series of flash-original video animations (OVAs) and a film, released from 2007 to 2009. A live-action film, starring Jun Kaname as Jaguar, was released in January 2008.

Plot
The story starts out with Kiyohiko "Piyohiko" Saketome trying to take a band audition. In his way he sees a strange man named Jaguar carrying a big case, which turns out to be holding only a small recorder. Piyohiko tries not to get distracted by him but fails, because when Jaguar plays his recorder, the most beautiful, passionate guitar-like sound comes out of it. He tries more and more record companies, but every time he meets Jaguar and somehow manages to miss his audition. Finally, Piyohiko gets accepted at a record company only to find out that he will be staying at his new dorm with Jaguar as his roommate. Jaguar becomes a teacher and sets up a recorder class at their music school, and Piyohiko somehow ends up in that class instead of the guitar class he wanted. From thereon in, the story is an episodic chronicle of Piyohiko and Jaguar's lives, where they get into hijinks with fellow musicians and other bizarre characters.

Characters

Jaguar is a strange man who likes to play the recorder. He and Piyohiko are roommates in Gari Dormitories, where he runs a recorder class. He is a musical genius, able to play any instrument with astounding skill. His performances can conjure up vivid images in people's minds. Jaguar can even make his recorder sound like a guitar if he wants.
Jaguar appears to have no purpose in life but to teach his recorder class, although his lessons are so lazy that it is the same as doing no work at all. However, he is strangely transcendent and nothing at all seems to truly bother him. He always wins his battles, and can always convince people to see his way. He contrasts Hammer, who has the same lazy lifestyle but is always the loser.
Later on, it is revealed that Jaguar is one of several children brainwashed in an experiment to create a band so amazing that it could shake the world, and bring world peace using the power of music. The laboratory where this experiment took place was called the Hotel Riverside Laboratory, also known as "Softcream". Jaguar's "father", one of the scientists at the lab, opposed the brainwashing and released all of the children.

Nickname:Piyohiko (ピヨ彦 Piyohiko)

Piyohiko is a normal man who dreams of being a great guitarist. Even though he thinks flutes are lame, he is in the Flute Class (mostly because of Jaguar) and, ironically, his family owns a flute shop (and his father is as weird as Jaguar).
 / 

A Hip hop ninja who lives in the attic above Jaguar and Piyohiko's room. He wants more than anything to be cool and popular, but goes about it in a way that always ends in failure and humiliation. Despite this he refuses to admit he is a ninja, because it would be bad for his trendy image.

A female student who once belonged to the Idol department before joining the flute department. She is also the internet idol  and is highly self-conscious. When she is talked to by others, she abuses or hits them because she is very shy. Since she is good at her way of abusing, she tends to act as a sadist automatically. As a result, she will please those whom she abused.
 / 

Bassist and lyricist in the popular band JULY (ジュライ jurai). Very handsome and pretentious, he likes to show off his poetry skills to his squealing fangirls. After meeting Jaguar, though, he is never the same again. Jaguar destroys Porgy's confidence in his poetry by first beating him in a poetry contest, then telling him that his poems are nothing but pretty lies. Porgy becomes unable to write and is kicked out of JULY, eventually spending his life stalking Jaguar and challenging him to poetry contests as his masked alter-ego Wrestler Mask (レスラー仮面 Resuraa Kamen). He is also trying to get back his position in JULY, but they have already replaced him with a new bassist.

A man who looks like a typical delinquent, with a regent hairstyle. He is aggressive toward Jaguar and his friends, but is really a soft-hearted guy who is just lonely and friendless. He is Hamidento's guardian and tries to be a good father, but does not notice that Hamii does not appreciate it. Like Hammer, he strives to get attention but fails miserably.

Nickname:Hamī (ハミー)

A cute little robot under the care of Billy. He does not acknowledge Billy as a parent at all, and while he pretends to be cute and loveable around him, a mean side of him comes out when Billy is not around. He smokes and sometimes acts like a teenage delinquent, and has everyone he knows ranked in order of respect. Jaguar is inexplicably high on the list, Hammer is always on the bottom. He also has amazing fighting power. Hamii is the series' mascot character.

Piyohiko's father, a maker of weird and rare flutes. Is close buddies with Jaguar due to their shared interest in flutes and desire to make Piyohiko play them. Piyohiko's dislike of flutes is most likely because of his father, who hopes for him to take over his business. Chichijirou is so laughably uncreative when designing flutes that to him, every one of Piyohiko's average ideas seems like a stroke of genius.

A mysterious Caucasian man whom Jaguar treats as his father. His name is written Ma-ike-ru, with Japanese characters for "between", "pond" and "stop". He sometimes turns transparent, and there are many not-so-subtle hints that he is a ghost. Jaguar believes his "father" is Japanese, and most certainly not a ghost.

Media

Manga
Pyū to Fuku! Jaguar is written and illustrated by Kyosuke Usuta. It was serialized in Shueisha's Weekly Shōnen Jump from September 4, 2000, to August 23, 2010. Shueisha compiled the 435 individual chapters into twenty tankōbon volumes published from September 4, 2001, to December 3, 2010.

Volume list

|}

Video games
Two video games based on the series have been released by Konami. The first game, Pyū to Fuku! Jaguar: Ashita no Jump, is an RPG for the PlayStation 2 released on March 18, 2004. , an action game for the Game Boy Advance, was released on April 29 of the same year.

Characters from Jaguar have also appeared in the Nintendo DS game Jump Super Stars and its sequel Jump Ultimate Stars, with Jaguar featured as a playable character in both games.

Jaguar Junichi appears as a support character in J-Stars Victory VS, a fighting game for the PlayStation 4, PlayStation 3, and PlayStation Vita. Its European and North American release marks the first release of Pyu to Fuku! Jaguar material outside Japan. The English title of the manga is officially given in the game as Phwoo! Blows the Jaguar.

Original video animation
A 3-episode Flash-animated original video animation series produced by Kaeruotoko Shokai was released from November 19, 2007, to January 21, 2008. Another 3-episode original video animation titled  was released from December 8, 2008, to February 23, 2009.

Live-action film
A live-action film was released on January 12, 2008. The DVD was released on June 23, 2008.

Anime film
An anime film titled  was released on January 10, 2009.

References

External links

2000 manga
2007 anime OVAs
Action anime and manga
Comedy anime and manga
Flash cartoons
Manga adapted into films
Music in anime and manga
Shōnen manga
Shueisha franchises
Shueisha manga
Japanese comedy films
Japanese action films